The 2010 Tour of Chongming Island World Cup was the first road race world cup running on the Tour of Chongming Island. The race started and finished in Chengqiao, China. 98 elite female cyclists took part in the race and 80 of them finished.

HTC-Columbia's Ina-Yoko Teutenberg lived-up to pre-race expectation as she capped a successful week in China. The German national champion finished fastest in a sprint finish, which saw Kirsten Wild (Cervelo TestTeam) finish second and Rochelle Gilmore (Australia) third.

In addition to strong crosswinds, the peloton faced torrential rain throughout the 138 kilometre race. Despite the conditions, a 20-rider group was able to break free of the peloton halfway through the event. HTC-Columbia's strong representation with 6 riders in the group meant the onus was placed on other teams to chase. Cervelo were able to shut down the impromptu escape 150 metres from the finish. Despite the German team's effort, Teutenberg was able to come around at the last minute to take the sprint from Wild and Gilmore. The lead-out for Teutenberg, Ellen van Dijk also had with her sixth place a top-10 finish.

General standings (top 10)

Results from uci.ch.

References

External links
 Official website

2010 in women's road cycling
2010 UCI Women's Road World Cup
Tour of Chongming Island
2010 in Chinese sport